M. polymorpha may refer to:

 Macrozamia polymorpha, a plant endemic to New South Wales, Australia
 Marchantia polymorpha, a large liverwort
 Martinia polymorpha, a perennial herb
 Medicago polymorpha, a plant native to the Mediterranean Basin
 Melanoides polymorpha, a freshwater snail
 Metrosideros polymorpha, an evergreen tree
 Mima polymorpha, a gram-negative bacterium
 Mitra polymorpha, a sea snail
 Mitrasacme polymorpha, a perennial herb
 Moquinia polymorpha, a sunflower native to Brazil, Bolivia, and Paraguay
 Moraxella polymorpha, a gram-negative bacterium
 Munidopsis polymorpha, a squat lobster
 Mycosphaerella polymorpha, a plant pathogen
 Mylabris polymorpha, a blister beetle